Mixed Up is the second remix album by Praga Khan. It was released in 2001.

Track listing
 "Luv U Still (Empirion Mix)" – 7:00	
 "Breakfast in Vegas (Insider Remix)" – 4:32	
 "The Jean Genie" – 4:54	
 "Supersonic Lovetoy (Sonic Dub)" – 4:45	
 "Lonely (Fuzz Mix)" – 7:09	
 "Phantasia Forever (Live Version)" – 6:03	
 "Love (Insider Remix)" – 6:12	
 "Far Beyond The Sun (Adrift On Oscillators Mix)" – 4:32	
 "The Moon (C.S.Johansen Remix)" – 4:28	
 "Lady Alcohol (Where the Fuck Am I? Mix)" – 7:09	
 "Lust for Life (Live Version)" – 3:56	
 "One Foot in the Grave (Artificial Life Mix)" – 5:33	
 "The Power of the Flower (Junkie XL Remix)" – 3:57	
 "Visions & Imaginations (Box Energy Mix)" – 3:49

References

2001 remix albums